The Bloch MB.210 and MB.211 were the successors of the French Bloch MB.200 bomber developed by Société des Avions Marcel Bloch in the 1930s and differed primarily in being low wing monoplanes rather than high wing monoplanes.

Development
The MB.210 derived from the MB.200 and differs in particular by having its cantilever wing set at the bottom of the fuselage, and in having a retractable undercarriage.

Developed as a private venture, the prototype MB.210 accomplished its first flight on 23 November 1934, powered by two 596 kW (800 hp) Gnome-Rhône 14Kdrs / Gnome-Rhône 14Kgrs air-cooled radial engines and having a fixed undercarriage. This was followed by a second prototype, the MB.211 Verdun, powered by 641 kW (860 hp) Hispano-Suiza 12Y V-12 liquid-cooled inlines and fitted with a retractable undercarriage, this flying on 29 August 1935. Initial flight testing of this version was somewhat disappointing, so no further examples were built. Further progress with the MB.210, however, convinced the Armée de l'Air to order series production, the first example of which flew on 12 December 1936.

The satisfaction did not last very long, however, since it was underpowered and the engines of production aircraft were inclined to overheating. The type was grounded until its engines could be replaced by the more powerful and reliable Gnome-Rhône 14N, these engines first being tested in summer 1937 and had to be replaced. Altogether, 257 units were manufactured amongst companies as diverse as Les Mureaux over Potez-CAMS, Breguet, Hanriot, and Renault.

Operational history
In September 1939, the Bloch MB.210 equipped 12 bomber units of the Armée de l'Air. At the time of Nazi Germany's attack on France in spring 1940, these squadrons were in the middle of a restructuring aimed at removing outdated aircraft from the front line. Up to the armistice on 25 June of the same year, the MB.210 was used still for nighttime bombing missions and shifted then to North Africa.

Variants

MB.210.01
First prototype, powered by 2x 596 kW (800 hp) Gnome-Rhône 14Kdrs / Gnome-Rhône 14Kgrs air-cooled radial engines.

MB.210Bn.4
Initial production version, powered by 2x Gnome-Rhône 14N-10 / Gnome-Rhône 14N-11 radial engines.

MB.210Bn.5
Hanriot-built variant with extra crew member.

MB.210H
Floatplane version powered by 2x Gnome-Rhône 14Kirs engines

MB.211.01
Prototype equipped with two 641 kW (860 hp) Hispano-Suiza 12Y inline engines.

MB.212
project

MB.218
project

Operators
 Bulgarian Air Force - Received six aircraft from Germany. 

French Air Force
French Navy
 Luftwaffe - (Used briefly for training in 1942 after the German occupation of France)
 Royal Romanian Air Force - Received 10 from an order of 24.
 Spain Spanish Republican Air Force received at least three aircraft.

Specifications (MB.210Bn.5)

See also

Notes

Bibliography

 Green, William. War Planes of the Second World War: Bombers and Reconnaissance Aircraft, Volume Seven. London: Macdonald, 1967.

External links

aviafrance
MB 210-211: Dassault

MB.210
1930s French bomber aircraft
Low-wing aircraft
Aircraft first flown in 1934
Twin piston-engined tractor aircraft